Otavite is a rare cadmium carbonate mineral with the formula CdCO3. Otavite crystallizes in the trigonal system and forms encrustations and small scalenohedral crystals that have a pearly to adamantine luster. The color is white to reddish to yellow brown. Its Mohs hardness is 3.5 to 4 and the specific gravity is 5.04. Associated minerals include azurite, calcite, malachite, and smithsonite.

It was first described in 1906 from the Tsumeb district near Otavi, Namibia.

References

Mindat locality data
Webmineral
Mineral galleries 

Cadmium minerals
Carbonate minerals
Calcite group
Trigonal minerals
Minerals in space group 167
Minerals described in 1906